Brovello-Carpugnino is a comune (municipality) in the Province of Verbano-Cusio-Ossola in the Italian region Piedmont, located about  northeast of Turin and about  southwest of Verbania.

Brovello-Carpugnino borders the following municipalities: Armeno, Gignese, Lesa, Massino Visconti, Stresa.

References

External links
 Official website

Cities and towns in Piedmont